Changle railway station is a railway station in Changle County, a part of Weifang City, Shandong.  It is on the Qingdao–Jinan passenger railway and the Qingdao–Jinan railway.

History 
The station was built in 1903. In April 2005, the station was closed to allow for construction work along the line. It reopened on 10 October 2010.

Service 
Though a large number of regular passenger trains go through Changle County, there are only a few CRH trains (headed D or G) stop at this station. Currently, passengers can reach Beijing South, Qingdao North/Qingdao, Rongcheng (in Weihai), Jinan/Jinan West from here.

References 

Railway stations in Shandong
Railway stations in China opened in 1903
Stations on the Qingdao–Taiyuan High-Speed Railway
Stations on the Qingdao–Jinan passenger railway